Cedars is a DART Light Rail station in Dallas, Texas. It is located at Belleview and Wall Streets in the Cedars neighborhood of South Dallas.

References

External links
 DART - Cedars Station

Dallas Area Rapid Transit light rail stations in Dallas
Railway stations in the United States opened in 1996
1996 establishments in Texas
Railway stations in Dallas County, Texas